An indirect presidential election was held in the Marshall Islands on 26 October 2009 following the ousting of incumbent President Litokwa Tomeing in the nation's first successful vote of no confidence on 21 October 2009.  Tomeing had been temporarily replaced by Ruben Zackhras as acting president.

Only two candidates were nominated for President, who is elected by the 33-member Nitijela. The candidates were Speaker Jurelang Zedkaia and former President Kessai Note, who had led the no confidence measure against Tomeing. Tomeing and Kessai had engaged in a power struggle since Kessai had lost his re-election bid in the 2007 election. Under the terms of the Marshallese constitution, the Nitijela had fourteen days to elect a new president.

Speaker Jurelang Zedkaia won election against former president Kessai Note with 17 to 15 votes. The results gave Zedkaia the one vote-minimum needed to defeat Kessai and win the presidency.

Senators did not vote along party lines during the election, with several crossing the aisle to vote for the presidential candidates in opposing parties. Nitijela Senator Brenson Wase was quoted as describing the shifting political affiliations of the electors as being as mixed up "as a fruit salad."

Observers noted that Zedkaia is an Iroij, or traditional chief, like his predecessor, Litokwe Tomeing. Zedkaia's status as Iroij may have been key to his narrow one-vote victory in the election.

President Zedkaia was sworn into office on November 2, 2009.

References

2009 elections in Oceania
Presidential election
2009